Paridhi is a given name in the English language. It is a name for girls in India, Sri Lanka and Bhutan. The name is of Sanskrit origin. It literally translates to realm/limit.

Notable people with name include :

 Paridhi Sharma (born 1987), an Indian actress/director.  
 Paridhi (born 11th century), a Tamil literary commentator

Indian masculine given names
Given names